The music of the Star Wars franchise is composed and produced in conjunction with the development of the feature films, television series, and other merchandise within the epic space opera franchise created by George Lucas. The music for the primary feature films (which serves as the basis for the rest of the related media) was written by John Williams. Williams' work on the series included the scores of nine feature films, a suite and several cues of thematic material for Solo and the theme music for the Galaxy's Edge Theme Park. These count among the most widely known and popular contributions to modern film music, and utilize a symphony orchestra and features an assortment of about fifty recurring musical themes to represent characters and other plot elements: one of the largest caches of themes in the history of film music.

Released between 1977 and 2019, the music for the primary feature films was, in the case of the first two trilogies, performed by the London Symphony Orchestra and, in select passages, by the London Voices chorus. The sequel trilogy was largely conducted by Williams and William Ross, and performed by the Hollywood Freelance Studio Symphony and (in a few passages) by the Los Angeles Master Chorale.

Additional composers have since contributed music to other movies and media within the Star Wars universe. The music for several animated and live-action television series spin-offs has been written by Kevin Kiner, Ludwig Göransson, Natalie Holt, Nicholas Britell, and Ryan Shore. Music for the spin-off films, other television programs, and video games, as well as the trailers of the various installments, were created by various other composers, with this material occasionally revisiting some of Williams' principal themes (and, with one spin-off film, with Williams actually writing a new theme for the composer to use).

The scores are primarily performed by a symphony orchestra of varying size joined, in several sections, by a choir of varying size. They each make extensive use of the leitmotif, or a series of musical themes that represents the various characters, objects and events in the films. Throughout all of the franchise, which consists of a total of over 18 hours of music, Williams has written approximately sixty or seventy themes, in one of the largest, richest collection of themes in the history of film music.

Overview

Films

Television

Animation series
Kevin Kiner composed the score to the film Star Wars: The Clone Wars (2008), the predecessor to the animated TV series of the same name. Both properties loosely use some of the original themes and music by John Williams. Kiner's own material for the film includes a theme for Anakin Skywalker's Padawan learner, Ahsoka Tano, as well as a theme for Jabba the Hutt's uncle Ziro. Kiner went on to score the TV series' entire seven seasons, which concluded in 2020. A soundtrack album was released in 2014 by Walt Disney Records.

Kiner continued his work with the franchise for the animated series Star Wars Rebels (2014), which also incorporates Williams' themes. He would later do the spin-off of Clone Wars, The Bad Batch in 2021.

Ryan Shore serves as the composer for Star Wars: Forces of Destiny (2017–2018).

LEGO Star Wars

Live-action series

The Mandalorian 
For the Disney+ series The Mandalorian, Oscar-winner Ludwig Göransson composes the score. For the third season of the series, Joseph Shirley composes the score replacing Göransson.

The Book of Boba Fett
For the Disney+ series The Book of Boba Fett, Ludwig Göransson composes the main theme, while Joseph Shirley composes the score.

Obi-Wan Kenobi
For the Disney+ series Obi-Wan Kenobi, John Williams returned to write the main theme. Natalie Holt composed the rest of the score, making her the first woman to score a live-action Star Wars project.

Andor
For the Disney+ series Andor, Nicholas Britell composes the score.

Skeleton Crew

Ahsoka

The Acolyte

Lando

Star Wars: Visions 
Various composers worked on the animated anthology series Star Wars: Visions.

Zen: Grogu and Dust Bunnies 
For the hand drawn anime short by Studio Ghibli Grogu and Dust Bunnies, Ludwig Göransson composes the score.

Jedi Temple Challenge 
For the game show Jedi Temple Challenge, Gordy Haab composes the score.

Documentaries

Video games

Multimedia

Other Albums

Style

Inspiration 
The scores utilize an eclectic variety of musical styles, many culled from the Late Romantic idiom of Richard Strauss and his contemporaries that itself was incorporated into the Golden Age Hollywood scores of Erich Korngold and Max Steiner. The reasons for this are known to involve George Lucas's desire to allude to the underlying fantasy element of the narrative rather than the science-fiction setting, as well as to ground the otherwise strange and fantastic setting in recognizable, audience-accessible music. Indeed, Lucas maintains that much of the films' success relies not on advanced visual effects, but on the simple, direct emotional appeal of its plot, characters and, importantly, music.

Lucas originally wanted to use tracked orchestral and film music in a similar manner to 2001: A Space Odyssey, itself a major inspiration for Star Wars. Williams, who was hired to consult and possibly work on the source music, was advised to form a soundtrack with recurring musical themes to augment the story, while Lucas's choice of music could be used as a temporary track for Williams to base his musical choices on. This resulted in several nods or homages to the music of Gustav Holst, William Walton, Sergei Prokofiev and Igor Stravinsky in the score to Star Wars.  Williams relied less and less on references to existing music in the latter eight scores, incorporating more strains of modernist orchestral writing with each progressive score, although occasional nods continue to permeate the music. The score to  Revenge of the Sith has clear resemblances to the successful scores of other contemporary composers of the time, namely Howard Shore's Lord of the Rings, Hans Zimmer's Gladiator and Tan Dun's Crouching Tiger, Hidden Dragon, with which the movie was most likely scored contemporarily. However, his later scores were otherwise mostly tracked with music of his own composition, mainly from previous Star Wars films. Williams also started to develop his style throughout the various films, incorporating other instruments, unconventional orchestral set-ups (as well as various choral ensembles) and even electronic or electronically attenuated music as the films progressed. Williams often composed the music in a heroic but tongue-in-cheek style, and has described the scored film as a "musical".

Structure 
Star Wars was one of the film scores that heralded the revival of grand symphonic scores in the late 1970s.  One technique that particularly influenced these scores is Williams' use of the leitmotif, which was most famously associated with Richard Wagner's Der Ring Des Nibelungen and, in early film scores, with Steiner. A leitmotif (or leading motive) is a recurring, evolving musical theme for narrative elements such as characters, locations, ideas, sentiments, objects or other specific part of the film. It is commonly used in modern film scoring as a device for mentally anchoring certain parts of a film to the soundtrack. Of chief importance for a leitmotif is that it must be strong enough for a listener to latch onto while being flexible enough to undergo variation and development along the progression of the story. The more varied and nuanced the use of leitmotif is, the more memorable it typically becomes. A good example of this is the way in which Williams subtly conceals the intervals of "The Imperial March" within "Anakin's Theme" in The Phantom Menace, implying his dark future to come.

Also important is the density in which leitmotifs are used: the more leitmotifs are used in a piece of a given length, the more thematically rich it is considered to be. Film music, however, typically needs to strike a balance between the number of leitmotives used, so as to not become too dense for the audience (being preoccupied with the visuals) to follow. Williams' music of Star Wars is unique in that it is relatively dense for film scoring, with approximately 17 themes used in each two-hour film, of which about 90% is scored.

Performance 
Williams re-recorded some of his suites from the first trilogy with the Skywalker Symphony Orchestra as an album. Several of his later themes were released as singles and music videos,  and were later released a collection of suites from the six films as a compilation that played to a series of clips from the films, with sparse dialogue and sound effects. These became the basis for a series of hour-long concerts which featured Star Wars music to images from the films, Star Wars: In Concert, which took place in 2009 and 2010. First performed in London, it went on to tour across the United States and Canada, last playing in London, Ontario, Canada on July 25, 2010.

The scores of the first trilogy (in the form of its Blu-Ray release) and The Force Awakens are performed as Live to Projection concerts, but with greatly reduced forces. The performances follow the music of the finished film, with some of the music looped, tracked or omitted entirely, and do not feature any of the diegetic pieces and often omit the choral parts.

Orchestration
John Williams sketched the score for his various orchestrations and wrote the music for a full symphony orchestra (ranging from 79 to 113 players overall

 

The Empire Strikes Back required 104 players, not including the conductor or synthesizer (rhttp://www.jw-collection.de/scores/tesblp.htmecalls ) due to the inclusion of a fourth flute, and sections that required a third harp, five oboes overall, an added piccolo and eight percussionists overall.

If the Empire Strikes Back is to augmented with the string section size of Revenge of the Sith or the Skywalker Symphony Recording, it would require about 112 players and a small women choir.

A Star Wars in Concert production that would follow the orchestration of the recording, would have to feature some of the expansions of the various episodes, requiring about 110 players, as well as the mixed choir and possibly the bass choir.</ref>) and, in several passages, chorus (ranging from 12 to 120 singers overall) and a few non-orchestral instruments. The orchestration is not consistent throughout the different films, but generally, the score makes use of a considerable brass section over a comparatively smaller string section, giving the series its heraldic, brassy sound.

Several of the scores require larger forces, including a large (over 100-piece) romantic-period orchestra, a mixed choir and even a boy choir, although none of the scores call for particularly immense forces compared to larger film or theater works. Nevertheless, due to added high woodwinds and percussion parts, scores such as Empire Strikes Back and Attack of the Clones call for 106 and 110 players, respectively. The former called for a third harp and fourth bassoon, while the latter (and all prequel scores) utilized a fuller string section. Revenge of the Sith also utilized a second set of timpani. Comparatively, the original Star Wars trilogy and the sequel trilogy films call for much smaller forces of as little as 82 players, and small choral accompaniment in select cues. The first spin-off film, Rogue One, followed the prequel trilogy's instrumentation, using a 110-piece orchestra and 90-piece mixed choir.

In live performances, the forces are usually greatly reduced: Official Star Wars Concerts were held with as little as 60-piece orchestras and 50-piece mixed choral ensembles or with the choir omitted altogether.

 However, to recreate the nine scores as they were originally recorded, the following instrumentation would be needed:
 Woodwinds: 3 flutes (doubling on piccolos and an alto flute), 2 oboes (doubling on a cor anglais), 3 clarinets (doubling on a bass clarinet and an E-flat clarinet), 2 bassoons (doubling on a contrabassoon).
 Brass: 6 horns (doubling on Wagner Tubas), 4 trumpets, 3 trombones, tuba.
 Keyboards: Piano, celesta, synthesizer.
 Timpani: 4–6 kettledrums.
 Percussion: at least three percussionists playing bass drums, tenor drums, snare drums (including guillotine drums, side drums, military drums), timbales, toms (floor tom and hanging toms), triangle, tambourine, cymbals (suspended, sizzle, crash and finger cymbals), tam-tam, xylophones, vibraphone, glockenspiel, tubular bells, and anvil on all episodes. Also required are temple blocks (I), claves (II, V, VI), ratchet (V–VIII), marimba (I, IV, VII–VIII), bongos (I, IV, VII–VIII), congas (I–III, VI–VII), log drums (I, IV, VI–VII), low wood block (IV), bell plates, clappers (IV), steel drum (IV, VIII), boobams (I, IV, VII), medium gong (VI–VII), kendhang, rattle, sistrum, shekere, guiro, bamboo sticks, cowbells, hyoshigi (VI), bell tree (III), one medium Thai gong (VI), three medium chu-daiko drums (II–III, one for VII–VIII), washboard, goblet drum, caxixi (VIII).
 Strings: 2 harps, 14 first violins, 12 second violins, 10 violas, 10 violoncellos, 6 double basses.
 Additional instruments: 1 piccolo, 1 flute, 1–2 recorders, 2 oboes, 1 clarinet, 3 saxophones, 1–2 bassoons, 2 horns, trumpet, bass trombone, tuba, set of timpani, five percussionists, 89-piece SATB choir, 10 basso profundo singers, 30 boys, 1 Tibetan throat singer, narrator, 4 violins divided, 2 violas, 2 contrabasses, 1 harp.
 Non-orchestral instruments: Cretan Lyra and cümbüş (I), electric guitar (II), toy piano (VI), kazzo, highland bagpipes, didgeridoo (VIII).

Musical themes in the scores
John Williams wrote a series of themes and motifs for certain characters and ideas in each of the Star Wars films. The multiple installments allowed Williams to compose some sixty or seventy themes and reprise some of them extensively, continually developing them over a long period of screen time.

Williams introduces a considerable, but manageable number of themes in each episode (seven themes on average), attempting to compose main themes that are distinct, long-lined and memorable. Connections between the themes are formed for narrative purposes or, more generally, in the favour of cohesion. As a result, some of the themes play very often: the Force Theme plays over one hundred times in the series.

Each score can be said to have a "main theme", which is developed and repeated frequently throughout the film, and represents the high and low points of the film itself as much as they do narrative elements within the film: for instance, the frequent use of The Imperial March in Empire Strikes Back. Besides the main theme and a handful of other principal themes, Williams forged several smaller motifs for each episode, which are generally not as memorable and at times interchangeable. As a result of his compositional process, a large number of incidental musical material and themes that are specific to certain setpieces also occur throughout the piece. Williams had designated the music of the main titles to be the main theme of the series as a whole, but there isn't necessarily a main theme for each trilogy. Instead, each trilogy (and to a lesser extent, each film) has its own style or soundscape.

Williams' Star Wars catalog remains one of the largest collections of leitmotifs in the history of cinema, although – for comparison – it still falls short of Wagner's use of leitmotifs in the Ring Cycle or even Howard Shore's work on the Hobbit and Lord of the Rings films. Both works feature many more themes for a similar or shorter running time; and use the themes with greater specificity and variation; where Williams prefers to write fewer themes (to allow him to focus on them better) and use them in a more straightforward manner and sometimes, solely for their romantic effect. Shore and Wagner's themes are also inter-related and arranged into sets of subsets of related themes through various melodic or harmonic connections, whereas Williams prefers greater distinction between his themes.

Williams scores the films one episode at a time and attempts to base each score on new material as much as possible. Therefore, the Imperial March makes no appearance in the original Star Wars, since Williams didn't conceive of it until he was scoring The Empire Strikes Back, and the same is true of Across the Stars and The Phantom Menace. Other themes get abandoned, like the Droid motive from The Empire Strikes Back or the original Imperial motives of the original Star Wars. Between trilogies, Williams had often changed his way of using leitmotives, moving from long-lined melodies in the classic trilogy to shorter, more rhythmic ideas in the prequel trilogy.

The use of the themes in the scores 
Williams doesn't always use his themes in a strictly narrative sense. In almost each entry, he will occasionally use a theme seemingly at random, purely because its mood fits the scene. Princess Leia's Theme is used for the death of Obi-Wan Kenobi in the original Star Wars, which has little to do with her character even though she is present in the scene. Yoda's Theme appears several times during the Cloud City sequences in The Empire Strikes Back. The concert piece Duel of the Fates is used several times throughout the prequel trilogy, appearing over the entire final battle in The Phantom Menace (as opposed to just the lightsaber duel for which it was written); Anakin Skywalker's search for his mother in Attack of the Clones; and the unrelated Yoda and Darth Sidious's duel in Revenge of the Sith. Williams' original composition for the Geonosis Battle Arena in Attack of the Clones, a variation on the Droid Army March, was used for the Utapau assault in Revenge of the Sith. Multiple uses of the Force Theme are also non-thematic.

This also happens through the use of tracked music. Attack of the Clones, the first film to be shot digitally, had major edits made after the scoring process, leading to the inclusion of tracked music over many of the digitally created sequences such as the Droid Factory on Geonosis or the Clone Army's arrival to the battle. These scenes used music such as Yoda's theme or incidental music from The Phantom Menace with little dramatic connection to what is occurring on screen. Musical similarities exist between the final scenes of The Phantom Menace with Finn's confession to Rey in The Force Awakens, probably a result of temp-track choice. In other cases, the material was not tracked but rather lifted from the original composition and re-recorded, such as in the big action scenes of Return of the Jedi, both of which lift material from the Battle of Yavin and Ben's death. Other composers to have used Williams' themes in spinoff materials have likewise sometimes used them loosely.

Over the long period in which the films were made, many of the themes changed their initial meaning: By the time of The Empire Strikes Back, the Luke Skywalker material and the theme of Old Ben were already rebranded as the "Star Wars Main theme" and "The Force Theme", respectively, by Williams. The Rebel Fanfare (initially, the fanfare of the Blockade Runner) eventually turned into the theme of the Millennium Falcon.

Themes 
Listed below are about 67 leitmotives, based on primarily on Williams own notes and Frank Lehman's extensive catalogue, but also on Doug Adams et al analyses of the scores. Along with two themes Williams composed for Solo and two more for Galaxy's Edge, his work of the series had accrued as many as 71 leitmotives. The main new theme of each entry is highlighted:

Original trilogy

Star Wars (A New Hope)
 "Luke's Theme (Star Wars Main Theme)"
 "Luke's (Star Wars) Secondary Theme"
 "The Rebel Spaceship Fanfare" (Millennium Falcon Theme)
 "Action Ostinato"
 "Old Ben's Theme (The Force Theme)"
 "Jawa Theme"
 "Princess Leia's Theme"
 "Imperial Motif"
 "Death Star Motif"
 "Rebel Victory Theme"

The Empire Strikes Back
Returning: Star Wars Theme, Star Wars Secondary Theme, Rebel Fanfare, The Force, Princess Leia, Rebel Victory
 "The Imperial March" (Darth Vader's Theme)
 
 :
 "Droids Motif"
 "Cloud City March"
 "Cloud City Trap"
 "Boba Fett Motif"
 "Dark Side theme"

Return of the Jedi
Returning: Spaceship Dogfight Motif; Star Wars Theme, Secondary Star Wars Theme, Rebel Fanfare, The Force, Leia, the Imperial March, Han Solo and the Princess, Yoda
 
 "Primitive Ewok Theme"
 "The Emperor's Theme"
 "Jabba The Hutt Theme"
 "Brother and Sister Arpeggios"
 "Triumph Fanfare"
 "Trap motif"
 "Luke and Leia Theme"
 First reprisal: "Spaceship Dogfight motif"

Prequel trilogy

The Phantom Menace 
Returning: Star Wars Theme, Stars Wars Secondary Theme, The Rebel Fanfare, The Force Theme, The Imperial March, Yoda's Theme, Jabba's Theme, The Emperor's Theme
 "Duel of the Fates"
 "Young Anakin's Theme"
 "Droid Invasion March"
 "Qui-Gon's Motif"
 "Darth Maul Motif"
 "Jar Jar's Theme"
 "Shmi's Theme"

Attack of the Clones
Returning: Shmi's Theme; Star Wars Theme,  Star Wars Secondary Theme, The Rebel Fanfare, The Force Theme, The Imperial March, The Emperor's Theme, Young Anakin's Theme, Droid Invasion March, Duel of the Fates
 "Across the Stars"
 "Across the Stars" (second theme)
 "Courting on Naboo Theme"
 "Separatist Motif"
 "Kamino Motif"
 "Mystery Motif"

Revenge of the Sith
Returning: Jedi Funeral Theme, Coruscant Fanfare; Star Wars Theme, Secondary Star Wars Theme, Leia's theme, The Rebel Fanfare, The Force Theme, The Imperial March, The Emperor's Theme, Young Anakin's Theme, Descent, Droid Invasion March, Duel of the Fates, Shmi, Across the Stars, Across the Stars (embryonic), Dark Side
 "Battle of the Heroes"
 "General Grievous' Motif"
 "Lament for Anakin Theme"
 First reprisal: "Funeral Theme"
 First reprisal: "Coruscant Fanfare"

Sequel trilogy

The Force Awakens 
Returning: Star Wars Theme, Secondary Star Wars Theme, Millennium Falcon, The Force theme, Leia's Theme, The Imperial March, Han Solo and the Princess
 "Rey's Theme"
 Rey's Chime Figure
 Rey's Gallop Figure
 "Kylo Ren's Fanfare"
 "Kylo Ren's Conflicted Motif"
 "First Order Theme"
 "Map Motif"
 "March of the Resistance"
 "Tension figure"
 "Pursuit Ostinato"
 "Poe Dameron's Motif"
 "Snoke's Theme"
 "Jedi Steps"

The Last Jedi 
Returning: Star Wars Theme, Secondary Star Wars Theme, Millennium Falcon, The Force Theme, Leia's Theme, Yoda's Theme, Luke and Leia, Han Solo and the Princess, The Imperial March, Spaceship Dogfight Motif, Death Star motif, The Emperor's Theme, Poe's Theme, Rey's Themes, Kylo Ren's themes, First Order, Tension figure, Snoke's Theme, Jedi Steps
 "Rose Tico's Theme"
 "Luke's Island Motif"
 "Rebel Desperation Motif"

The Rise of Skywalker 

Returning: Star Wars Theme, Secondary Star Wars Theme, Millennium Falcon, The Force Theme, Leia's Theme, Han Solo and the Princess, The Imperial March, The Emperor's Theme, Poe's Theme, Rey's Themes, Kylo Ren's themes, March of the Resistance, Luke and Leia, Yoda's Theme, Dark Side, Tension figure
 "The Trio Theme"
 "The Rise of Skywalker (Victory) Theme"
 "Anthem of Evil (Psalm of the Sith)"
 "Poe's Heroics Theme"
 "Sith Artifacts"
 "Knights of Ren Motif"

Incidental motifs 
Since neither Williams nor his office ever provided a full list of the leitmotifs used in every Star Wars film, there is some controversy around the exact number of themes, with some taking an inclusive approach that identifies various leitmotifs, even where the composer probably never intended for, and others taking an exclusive, reductive approach.

Some of the more inclusive analyses identify themes that don't actually recur either in discrete cues nor even strewn across one long stretch of music. This is the result of Williams' propensity (in these scores and otherwise) to write material that is either melodic, rhythmic, harmonic or timbral specifically to an individual setpiece or none-recurring plot-element in the film, such as The Battle of Hoth, the Chase through Coruscant, or The Battle of Crait. These individual pieces of music – whether they consist of a full melody, ostinati, diegetic pieces or a certain timbre – have sometimes been described as having thematic significance, occasionally (in fleeting comments) even by Williams himself, but since they do not recur in a different part of the narrative, nor are transformed from or into another motif, they do not comply with the definition of a leitmotif.

Even when some of these figures do recur, it is often unclear whether they are substantial enough to be assigned with thematic significance, as these instances often includes material that is incidental in nature, such as several figures used in the finale of The Empire Strikes Back; material that is purely rhythmic or timbral like various "bouncing" horn figures for Luke's landspeeder search in the original Star Wars, material that is of a generic nature, such as his use of "mournful homophonic" choir in The Last Jedi for climactic moments; or material that is part of Williams' stylistic choices as a composer, more than a thematic statement unique to the series. For instance, his use of tritones often denotes mystery, a device he uses for the droids landing on Tatooine and again in the concert arrangement of "The Throne Room."

In fact, sometimes the supposedly recurring material is similar, but not in fact identical. A good example would be the variety of gestures relating to the dark side, following a piece of music used in the opera-house scene. Lehamn however clarifies that those alleged following statements are "similar but inexact" to the earlier gesture.

Sometimes, the recurring material is question is not part of the original composition but is rather tracked after-the-fact, or at least lifted, from existing material into a different section of the film, or from material that is recapitulated in a concert piece or end-credits suite. This includes the Podracing fanfare and the ostinato accompaniment of the Rebel Fanfare, which otherwise does not appear isolated from the unabridged theme more than once; the mournful writing for French horn at Shmi's funeral, the Arena March from Attack of the Clones etc.

Themes in the Anthology films
The first Star Wars Anthology score for Rogue One, written by Michael Giacchino, utilizes several themes (and recurring interstitial material) from John Williams, mostly for their Romantic sweep (such as The Force Theme and hints of the Main Theme). It has its own catalog of themes, independent from Williams' material, including a new, third theme for the Empire, although Giacchino also quotes both the original Imperial Motif and The Imperial March.

Rogue One 
Returning: Luke's Theme; Rebel Fanfare; The Force Theme; Leia's Theme; Imperial Motif; Death Star Motif; The Imperial March
 Jyn's Theme
 Hope Theme
 Guardians of the Whills Theme
 Imperial Theme (Krennic's Theme)

Solo
For Solo, John Williams wrote and recorded a concert arrangement for a new theme for Han Solo. In the process of composing the theme, Williams ended up using two separate ideas, each conveying a different aspect of the character, and went as far as to spot the film for places to use each motif; all other leitmotifs and other material were written and adapted by John Powell, the main composer for the film.

Returning: Spaceship Dogfight motif; Star Wars Theme; Millennium Falcon theme; Duel of the Fates; The Imperial March; The Imperial motif; Death Star Motif; The Asteroid Field; Imperial Cruiser Pursuit; Droids Motif

By John Williams:
 Han Solo's Theme
 "Han Solo's Searching theme"

By John Powell:
 Chewbacca's Theme
 Han and Qi'Ra's Love Theme
 L3'S Theme
 Crew theme
 Enfys Nest Theme
 Crime Syndicate Motif (Vos's Theme)

Concert suites
Instead of offering a full recording release of a particular film, Williams typically releases a condensed score on album, in which the music is arranged out of the film order and more within the veins of a concert program. These album releases typically include several concert suites, written purely for the end credits or the album itself, where a specific theme is developed continuously throughout the piece. Williams also re-edited some of his existing cues after the fact in order to "concertize" theme on the behest of conductors such as Charles Gerhardt. Five of the eight films also have unique credit suites that feature alternate concert arrangements of themes and/or a medley of the main themes of a particular film.

Original Trilogy 
Star Wars Episode IV: A New Hope
 "Main Title"
 "Princess Leia's Theme"
 "The Little People"
 "Cantina Band"
 "Here They Come!"
 "The Battle"
 "Throne Room and End Title"

Star Wars Episode V: The Empire Strikes Back
 "The Imperial March"
 "Yoda's Theme"
 "Han Solo and the Princess (1980)"
 "Han Solo and the Princess (2018)"

Star Wars Episode VI: Return of the Jedi
 "Parade of the Ewoks"
 "Luke and Leia"
 "Jabba the Hutt"
 "The Forest Battle"

Prequel Trilogy 
Star Wars Episode I: The Phantom Menace
 "Duel of the Fates"
 "Anakin's Theme"
 "The Adventures of Jar Jar"
 "The Flag Parade"

Star Wars Episode II: Attack of the Clones
 "Across the Stars"

Star Wars Episode III: Revenge of the Sith
 "Battle of the Heroes"

Sequel Trilogy 
Star Wars Episode VII: The Force Awakens
 "Rey's Theme"
 "March of the Resistance"
 "Adagio"
 "Scherzo for X-Wings"
 "The Jedi Steps"

Star Wars Episode VIII: The Last Jedi
 "The Rebellion is Reborn"

Star Wars Episode IX: The Rise of Skywalker
 "The Rise of Skywalker"
 "The Speeder Chase"
 "Anthem of Evil"

From the spin-offs 
From Rogue One
 "Jyn Erso and Hope Suite"
 "The Imperial Suite"
 "The Guardians of the Whills Suite"

From Solo
 "The Adventures of Han"

Diegetic music
Diegetic music is music "that occurs as part of the action (rather than as background), and can be heard by the film's characters". In addition to the orchestral scope that was brought on by John Williams' musical score, the Star Wars franchise also features many distinguishing diegetic songs that enrich the detail of the audio mise-en-scène. Some of this diegetic music was written by John Williams; some by his son, Joseph; and some by various other people.

From Star Wars
 "Cantina Band" and "Cantina Band #2". Written by John Williams, it is played in the Mos Eisley Cantina on Tatooine. It is written for solo trumpet, three saxophones, clarinet, Fender Rhodes piano, steel drum, synthesizer and various percussion, including boobams and toms. According to the Star Wars Customizable Card Game, the diegetic title for the first Cantina band piece is "Mad About Me". The liner notes for the 1997 Special Edition release of the Star Wars soundtrack describe the concept behind these works as "several creatures in a future century finding some 1930's Benny Goodman swing band music ... and how they might attempt to interpret it". This piece also appears on an all the outtake easter eggs on the Episode I and Episode II and on the bonus disc of the 2004 original trilogy DVD set.

From Return of the Jedi
 "Jabba's Baroque Recital". Mozart-esque John Williams composition (featuring a synthesized harpsichord) played while 3PO and R2 first arrive and play Jabba the message from Luke Skywalker.
 "Lapti Nek". Written by Joseph Williams (John Williams' son) and translated into Huttese, this is played by the Max Rebo Band in Jabba the Hutt's palace (in the original cut of the movie).
 "Jedi Rocks" (composed by Jerry Hey). This was composed to replace "Lapti Nek" for the 1997 Special Edition of the film.
 "Max Rebo Band Jams".  Heard twice in the film, once after Jabba sends the Wookiee Chewbacca to jail, and again on Jabba's sail barge Khetanna (hence its title). A recording of the first can be found on the official Star Wars Soundboards.
 "Ewok Feast" and "Part of the Tribe". By John Williams. Heard when Luke and company were captured by the Ewoks and brought to their treehouses.
 "Ewok Celebration". The Victory Song, whose lyrics were written by Joseph Williams, can be heard at the end of the original release of Return of the Jedi.
 "Victory Celebration". By John Williams. The Victory Song at the end of the Return of the Jedi 1997 re-edition.

From The Phantom Menace
 "Tatooine Street Music". Joseph Williams wrote four separate pieces of unusual, vaguely Eastern sounding source music for the streets of Mos Espa, featuring a player on Cretan Lyra and Cumbus, and a solo, wailing female vocal.
 "Augie's Municipal Band". By John Williams. Music played during the peace parade at the end of the film, it is a sped-up, attenuated trumpet and boy choir composition. It is closely related to the Emperor's Theme, but is not an outright quote of it.

From Attack of the Clones
 "Dex's Diner"
 "Unknown Episode II Source Cue". A second source cue is credited to Joseph Williams' name for Episode II, but is not heard in the film.
 "Arena Percussion". Originally meant to accompany the Droid Factory sequence, Ben Burtt's attempt at composition is instead shifted to the arena, replacing the predominantly unused John Williams cue "Entrance of the Monsters."

From The Force Awakens
 "Jabba Flow" and "Dobra Doompa". Written by Lin-Manuel Miranda and J. J. Abrams, these songs were played at Maz Kanata's castle.

From The Last Jedi
 "Canto Bight". Written by John Williams, it appears when Finn and Rose first arrive to the casino planet of Canto Bight. It is written in the style of big-band jazz and is stylistically akin to the "Cantina Band" music from Star Wars. The track features solo alto saxophone, two baritone saxophones, solo clarinet, trombones, kazoo, muted trumpets, Fender Rhodes piano, bass, synthesizers, steel drums, and various percussion, including washboards and goblet drums. The track briefly quotes "Aquarela do Brasil" (which also features hi-hat and ride cymbals) by Ary Barroso as a reference to the 1985 Terry Gilliam film Brazil, and includes a brief piano statement of Williams' and Johnny Mercer's theme from The Long Goodbye.
 "Caretaker party music": source cue of an unknown composition (possibly by Williams), which features highland bagpipes and a didgeridoo, and accompanies a deleted scene from the film.

From The Rise of Skywalker
 "Lido Hey": Written by Lin-Manuel Miranda and J. J. Abrams and performed by Shag Kava, a musical moniker for Miranda and Abrams. Plays as the main characters participate and traverse the Festival of Ancestors on the desert planet Pasaana.
 "Oma's Place": Performed by Ricky Tinez and J. J. Abrams. Plays as the main characters enter a bar owned by Oma Tres (featuring composer John Williams in a cameo role) on the planet Kijimi.

From Solo: A Star Wars Story
 "Chicken in the Pot". Written by John Powell, it is performed on Dryden Vos' yacht when Solo reunites with Qi'ra and first meets Vos.

Reception

Accolades 
In 2005, the 1977 soundtrack for Star Wars was voted as the "most memorable film score of all time" by the American Film Institute in the list AFI's 100 Years of Film Scores, based on the assessment of a jury of over 500 artists, composers, musicians, critics and historians from the film industry.

Certifications
The soundtracks to both Star Wars and Star Wars Episode I: The Phantom Menace have been certified Platinum by the Recording Industry Association of America, for shipments of at least 1 million units, with the albums for The Empire Strikes Back and Star Wars Episode II: Attack of the Clones being certified Gold (500,000 units). The British Phonographic Industry certified Star Wars and Episode I as Gold for shipments of over 100,000 units in the UK.

Notes

References

External links

 The Official Star Wars Music Site (Archived)
 Complete Catalogue of the Musical Themes of Star Wars

 
Compositions by John Williams
Music by media franchise